The men's freestyle 120 kilograms is a competition featured at the 2010 World Wrestling Championships, and was held at the Olympic Stadium in Moscow, Russia on 12 September.

This freestyle wrestling competition consists of a single-elimination tournament, with a repechage used to determine the winner of two bronze medals.

Results
Legend
F — Won by fall

Final

Top half

Bottom half

Repechage

References
Results Book, Page 102

Men's freestyle 120 kg